Princh is a Danish software company that was founded in 2015. Princh develos cloud printing and electronic payment products and is headquartered in the city of Aarhus, Denmark.

Based on the idea of the sharing economy, Princh is building a global network of printers. Via a smartphone or web app, users can locate a printer nearby, get directions to go there and print and pay for the print job. The product is available as native mobile apps for Android and iOS, as well as on web and desktop products for businesses and libraries. The app connects a network of printer owners and users around the world. Princh supports all types of printable files.

History 
The company was founded in 2015. During the first months, the headquarters were located at the Navitas building, at the harbour of Aarhus. Later in 2015, the company signed an investment deal with a private investor, allowing Princh to move to bigger offices and expand the team.  The company is currently based in the southern part of Aarhus. The Princh printing service was officially launched on June 23, 2015.

Currently, Princh is available as a service in a multitude of locations such as print shops, libraries, hotels, or universities. Princh is a popular printing and payment product among libraries and can among other places be found in Denmark, Sweden, Norway, Germany, United Kingdom, United States, and Canada.

How it works 

With the Princh app, users will be able to locate their nearest printer. Once the user is at the printer, the user chooses the document to be printed out and shares it with the Princh app. The user then selects the desired nearby printer entering the printer ID number or scanning the QR-code located on top of the printer, pays electronically and the print job is processed by the printer. 

Printer owners get access to a personal control panel where they can set printing prices and monitor all Princh activity for their business.

Notes and references

See also
 Printer (computing)
 Application software
 Cloud printing

Computer printing
Cloud computing